Court Cam is an American documentary television series that airs on A&E. It is hosted by Dan Abrams. It first aired on December 5, 2019, with 8 episodes of the first season.

The show also observes some court footages via archival footages from the late 20th century. As of 2022, over 128 episodes have aired. The show has been renewed for a fifth season, which aired on March 30, 2022.

Overview
The show is hosted by Dan Abrams, who observes on the surveillance camera to catch a glimpse of a series of events in the courtroom. The show also describes the suspects' criminal charge and sentencing, depending whether the defendant is either innocent or guilty. Additionally, various judges, witnesses and victims are interviewed during the course of the show, including Emmy Award-winning reporter Rob Wolchek and veteran judge Vonda Evans.

The show catches footages of physical altercations, heated outbursts, and disturbances in public places, such as courtrooms, stores and elsewhere, like when former child actor Peter Robbins was observed as an example of outbursts in the show.

Episodes

Format
When the show first aired in 2019, Abrams had interviews with interviewees in person. In the second season, because of the COVID-19 pandemic, he interviews the witnesses and judges remotely.

References

External links
 Court Cam on A&E
 

English-language television shows
Television shows set in the United States
2019 American television series debuts
2010s American documentary television series
2020s American documentary television series
Television productions suspended due to the COVID-19 pandemic
 Television shows about the COVID-19 pandemic
A&E (TV network) original programming